Unionicola is a genus of freshwater arachnids, belonging to the family Unionicolidae. The genus was described in 1842 by Samuel Stehman Haldeman. The genus has cosmopolitan distribution.

Most Unionicola are associated with mollusks, but Unionicola crassipes and Unionicola minor are associated with sponges of family Spongillidae. The association with mussels can be described as symbiotic. There is evidence that mites consume host tissue and can be associated with reduced host fitness, although the causal direction of the latter remains unclear.

Species include the following:
 Unionicola gracilipalpis
 Unionicola figuralis
 Unionicola crassipes
 Unionicola aculeata
 Unionicola ypsilophora (Bonz, 1783)

References

Trombidiformes
Acari genera
Taxa named by Samuel Stehman Haldeman